Scott Frederick Turow (born April 12, 1949) is an American author and lawyer. Turow has written 13 fiction and three nonfiction books, which have been translated into more than 40 languages and sold more than 30 million copies. Turow’s novels are set primarily among the legal community in the fictional Kindle County. Films have been based on several of his books.

Life and career
Turow was born in Chicago, to a family of Russian Jewish descent. He attended New Trier High School and graduated from Amherst College in 1970, as a brother of the Alpha Delta Phi Literary Society. He received an Edith Mirrielees Fellowship to Stanford University’s Creative Writing Center, which he attended from 1970 to 1972.

Turow later became a Jones Lecturer at Stanford, serving until 1975, when he entered Harvard Law School. In 1977, Turow wrote One L, a book about his first year at law school. After earning his Juris Doctor (J.D.) degree cum laude in 1978, Turow became an Assistant U.S. Attorney in Chicago, serving in that position until 1986. There, he prosecuted several high-profile corruption cases, including the tax fraud case of state Attorney General, William Scott. Turow was also lead counsel in Operation Greylord, the federal prosecution of judicial corruption cases in Illinois.  

After leaving the U.S. Attorney's Office, Turow became a novelist and wrote the legal thrillers Presumed Innocent (1987), The Burden of Proof (1990), Pleading Guilty (1993), and Personal Injuries, which Time magazine named as the Best Fiction Novel of 1999. All four books became bestsellers, and Turow won multiple literary awards, most notably the Silver Dagger Award of the British Crime Writers' Association.

In 1990, Turow was featured on the June 11 cover of Time, which described him as "Bard of the Litigious Age". In 1995, Canadian author Derek Lundy published a biography of Turow, entitled Scott Turow: Meeting the Enemy (ECW Press, 1995). In the 1990s, a British publisher bracketed Turow’s work with that of Margaret Atwood and John Irving, republished in the series Bloomsbury Modern Library.

Turow was elected the President of the Authors Guild in 2010, which he was previously President of from 1997 to 1998. As the President of the Authors Guild, he has been criticized for his copyright maximalist and anti-ebook stance. Turow has often responded that he is not against E-books, however, and he has shared that, in fact, he does the majority of his own reading electronically. According to Turow, he is interested in protecting writing as a livelihood.

From 1997 to 1998, Turow was a member of the U.S. Senate Nominations Commission for the Northern District of Illinois, which recommends federal judicial appointments. In 2011, Turow met with Harvard Law School professor, Lawrence Lessig, to discuss political reform, including a possible Second Constitutional Convention of the United States. According to one source, Turow saw risks with having such a convention, but he believed that it may be the "only alternative,” given his stance that campaign money can undermine the one man, one vote principle of democracy.

Turow is a retired partner of the international law firm Dentons having been a partner of one of its constituents, the Chicago law firm of Sonnenschein Nath & Rosenthal. Much of Turow’s caseload work is pro bono, including a 1995 case, in which he won the release of Alejandro Hernandez, a man that spent 11 years on death row for a murder he did not commit. He was also appointed to the commission considering the reform of the Illinois death penalty by former Governor George Ryan. Additionally, Turow was the first Chair of the Illinois Executive Ethics Commission, and he served as one of the 14 members on the Commission, which was appointed in March of 2000, by Illinois Governor George Ryan to consider reform of the capital punishment system. Turow also served as a member of the Illinois State Police Merit Board 2000–2002.

Bibliography

Novels
Turow’s fiction is set primarily among the legal community in the fictional Kindle County. According to Turow, he planned to set his first novel, ‘’Presumed Innocent’’ in Boston, where he attended law school. But by the time he finished the work, the setting had taken on characteristics of Chicago, Turow’s hometown to which he had returned.

 Presumed Innocent, 1987 (Film)
 The Burden of Proof, 1990 (TV miniseries)
 Pleading Guilty, 1993
 The Laws of Our Fathers, 1996
 Personal Injuries, 1999
 Reversible Errors, 2002 (TV film)
 Ordinary Heroes, 2005
 Limitations, 2006
 Innocent, 2010 (TV film)
 Identical, 2013
 Testimony, May 2017
 The Last Trial, 2020
 Suspect, Sept 2022

As editor
 Guilty As Charged, 1996 (as editor)
 The Best American Mystery Stories, 2006 (as editor)

Non-fiction
 One L, 1977
 Ultimate Punishment: A Lawyer's Reflections on Dealing with the Death Penalty, 2003
 Hard Listening, co-authored in July 2013, an interactive ebook about his participation in a writer/musician band, the Rock Bottom Remainders. Published by Coliloquy, LLC.

Reception
His non-fiction work Ultimate Punishment also received the Robert F. Kennedy Center for Justice and Human Rights 2003 Book award given annually to a novelist who "most faithfully and forcefully reflects Robert Kennedy's purposes – his concern for the poor and the powerless, his struggle for honest and even-handed justice, his conviction that a decent society must assure all young people a fair chance, and his faith that a free democracy can act to remedy disparities of power and opportunity."

Films
 Presumed Innocent, 1990
 The Burden of Proof, 1992
 Reversible Errors, 2004
 Innocent, 2011

Awards 
Scott Turow was inducted as a Laureate of The Lincoln Academy of Illinois and awarded the Order of Lincoln (the State’s highest honor) by the Governor of Illinois in 2000 in the area of Communications.

See also

 List of bestselling novels in the United States
 Second Constitution of the United States

References

External links
Official website
 
 
A reading from The Laws of Our Fathers by Scott Turow
Interview on Ordinary Heroes at the Pritzker Military Museum & Library
 

1949 births
Living people
Amherst College alumni
Stanford University alumni
Stanford University faculty
Harvard Law School alumni
New Trier High School alumni
American thriller writers
Rock Bottom Remainders members
20th-century American novelists
21st-century American novelists
American people of Russian-Jewish descent
Writers from Chicago
Illinois lawyers
American male novelists
20th-century American male writers
21st-century American male writers
Novelists from Illinois